John Taylor (c. 1503 – 1554) was an English churchman and academic, Bishop of Lincoln from 1552 to 1554.

Life
Taylor served as bursar then proctor of Queens' College, Cambridge from 1523 to 1537, and master of St John's College, Cambridge from 1538 to 1546. He was rector of St Peter upon Cornhill, London, of Tatenhill, Staffordshire, Dean of Lincoln Cathedral, a Reformer and Commissioner for the first Prayer Book.

According to John Foxe's Acts and Monuments, John Taylor walked out of mass celebrated at the commencement of the 1553 parliament. He was discharged from parliament and convocation on 5 October 1553, In 1553 Taylor was sent by Mary to the Tower for his action and that he died soon after. In later editions Foxe corrected this, asserting Taylor was commanded to attend and died shortly afterwards at Ankerwyke House at Wraysbury in Buckinghamshire.

Notes

References

External links
John Foxe's Book of Martyrs - page with John Taylor

   

1500s births
1554 deaths
Fellows of Queens' College, Cambridge
Alumni of St John's College, Cambridge
Masters of St John's College, Cambridge
Bishops of Lincoln
16th-century Church of England bishops
Deans of Lincoln
1503 births